The 1948 Kentucky Derby was the 74th running of the Kentucky Derby. The race took place on May 1, 1948, on a track rated sloppy.

Full results

 Winning breeder: Calumet Farm (KY)

References

1948
Kentucky Derby
Derby
Kentucky Derby